Sticta tainorum is a rare species of foliose lichen in the family Peltigeraceae. Found in Puerto Rico, it was formally described as a new species in 2020 by Joel Mercado‐Díaz and Robert Lücking. It is only known to occur on a few trees in high-elevation forests on the eastern part of the island, near Pico Doña Juana. The specific epithet refers to the indigenous Taíno people.

References

tainorum
Lichen species
Lichens described in 2020
Lichens of the Caribbean
Taxa named by Robert Lücking